Good Girl Gone Bad: The Remixes is the first remix album by Barbadian singer Rihanna. It was released on January 27, 2009, through Def Jam Recordings. The album contains club remixes of tracks from her third studio album Good Girl Gone Bad (2007) and its 2008 re-release, Good Girl Gone Bad: Reloaded. The songs were remixed by producers and disc jockeys such as Moto Blanco, Tony Moran, Soul Seekerz and Wideboys. The remixes appear in the form of radio edits instead of full-length versions.

The compilation received generally mixed reviews from music critics; the album was recommended for fans who were awaiting the release of Rihanna's next studio album. Good Girl Gone Bad: The Remixes peaked at number 106 on the Billboard 200 and number four on the Dance/Electronic Albums chart. It was ranked as the 22nd best-selling album of 2009 on the latter chart, and it has sold 49,000 copies in the US to date.

Background

American publication Rap-Up announced on December 21, 2008 that Rihanna would release her first remix album, titled Good Girl Gone Bad: The Remixes, in late-January 2009. The cover art, designed by Ciarra Pardo, and the official release date were revealed two days later. Def Jam Recordings released the album in the United States on January 27, 2009, in CD, digital, and vinyl formats. The set was later released in the United Kingdom on February 9, 2009. The compilation is made up of electronic dance remixes of tracks from Rihanna's third studio album Good Girl Gone Bad and two songs from its 2008 re-release, Good Girl Gone Bad: Reloaded. All standard edition tracks from the original album were remixed for the compilation, excluding "Lemme Get That", "Rehab" and "Sell Me Candy".

The remixes were done by producers and disc jockeys Moto Blanco, Jody den Broeder, Paul Emanuel, Seamus Haji, K-Klass, Lindbergh Palace, Tony Moran, Warren Rigg, Soul Seekerz and Wideboys. Soul Seekerz and Wideboys contributed the most remixes, with three tracks each—"Breakin' Dishes", the original album's title song and "Say It" were provided by Soul Seekerz, while Wideboys remixed  "Shut Up and Drive", "Question Existing", and "Don't Stop the Music". On the back cover, however, the Wideboys remix of "Don't Stop the Music" is mistakenly credited to Jody den Broeder. A Broeder remix of the track was released, but was not included on the album. The track listing is a reworked version of the bonus disc from the European deluxe edition of Good Girl Gone Bad. However, Good Girl Gone Bad: The Remixes excludes the remixes of the A Girl like Me single "SOS" and the Good Girl Gone Bad bonus tracks "Cry" and "Haunted", in favor of remixes of the new Reloaded tracks "Disturbia" and "Take a Bow". Additionally, a Lindberg Palace remix of "Umbrella" was added. While the original album's bonus disc includes the full-length remixes, Good Girl Gone Bad: The Remixes includes only radio edits, which cut the original versions by three to four minutes.

Critical reception
Critical reception of Good Girl Gone Bad: The Remixes was generally mixed. Jamie Nicholes of Noize Magazine was positive and observed that "there's actually quite a bit ... to appreciate here". The writer noted that the radio edits were possibly used to "make it more digestible to the masses who don't understand full length mixes". In an editorial review for Rhapsody, Rachel Devitt briefly commented that Rihanna gets "even more mileage out of her phenomenal, hit-generating third album" with the remix compilation. Between the Lines critic Chris Azzopardi was mixed in his review, writing: "Milking her 2007 album, Good Girl Gone Bad, for the third time, the 12-track disc is (insert frown here) all radio edits." The reviewer regarded the content as "mostly tightly produced", naming the two remixes of "Umbrella" and the sped-up "Push Up on Me" as examples. AllMusic's Andy Kellman was also mixed regarding the compilation, calling it "both a cash-in and a wasted opportunity." Kellman liked that the label opted for the radio edits instead of the full-length versions, remarking: "The edits ... were possibly favored to further emphasize the disc's alternate standing to the original set ... it plays out more like a proper album than a standard, disjointed remix compilation." Kellman recommended the album for fans who had "worn out the original album", commenting that "the disc will certainly help pass the time before Rihanna's fourth album".

Commercial performance
In the United States, Good Girl Gone Bad: The Remixes debuted and peaked at number 106 on the Billboard 200, with first-week sales of just under 5,000 copies. It also debuted at number four on the Dance/Electronic Albums chart. Ultimately, the album remained on Dance/Electronic Albums chart for a total of 18 weeks and was ranked at number 22 on the 2009 year-end chart. It also peaked at number 59 on the Top R&B/Hip-Hop Albums chart. By July 2010, Good Girl Gone Bad: The Remixes had sold 49,000 copies in the US, according to Nielsen SoundScan.

Track listing

(*) denotes co-producer
(^) denotes remixer and additional producer
(**) mistakenly credited to Jody den Broeder

Credits and personnel
Credits are adapted from the Good Girl Gone Bad: The Remixes booklet.

Robert Allen – songwriting
Joey Arbagey – remix A&R
Quaadir Atkinson – songwriting
Chris Brown – background vocals, songwriting
Ewart Brown – songwriting
Jay Brown – A&R
The Carter Administration – executive production
Shawn Carter – songwriting
Jon Cohen – keyboards
Eddie Craig – additional production, remixing
Kevin "KD" Davis – mixing
Jody den Broeder – additional production, remixing
Roberto Deste – photography
Clifton Dillon – songwriting
Sly Dunbar – songwriting
Paul Emanuel – additional production, drums, keyboards, remixing
Mikkel Storleer Eriksen – recording, songwriting
Gillian Gilbert – songwriting
Seamus Haji – drums, keyboards, additional production, remixing
Kuk Harrell – recording, songwriting, vocal production
Danny Harrison – additional production, remixing
Al Hemberger – mixing, recording
Tor Erik Hermansen – songwriting
Andy Hickey – keyboards
Peter Hook – songwriting
Michael Jackson – songwriting
Julian Jonah – guitar
Terese Joseph – A&R administration
Doug Joswick – package production
K-Klass – additional production, remixing
Brian Kennedy – production
Simon Langford – additional production, keyboards, remixing
Daniel Laporte – recording
Fabienne Leys – A&R coordination
Lindbergh Palace – remixing
Deborah Mannis-Gardner – sample clearance agent
Manny Marroquin – mixing
Andre Merritt – songwriting, background vocals

Tony Moran – engineering, remixing
Russ Morgan – additional production, remixing
Stephen Morris – songwriting
Moto Blanco – additional production, remixing
Julian Napolitano – additional production, keyboards, remixing
Ne-Yo – production, vocal production
Neo Da Matrix – production
Greg Ogan – recording
Ciarra Pardo – art direction, design
Lionel Richie – songwriting
Makeba Riddick – songwriting, vocal production
Warren Rigg – engineering, remixing
Paul Roberts – production, remixing
J. Peter Robinson – art direction, design
Evan Rogers – executive production, production, songwriting
J. R. Rotem – production, songwriting
Brian Seals – songwriting
George Seara – recording
Arthur Smith – additional production, remixing
Shaffer Smith – songwriting
Tyran "Ty Ty" Smith – A&R
Soul Seekerz – remixing
Stargate – production
Christopher Stewart – songwriting, production
Carl Sturken – executive production,  production, songwriting
Jim Sullivan – additional production, remixing
Bernard Sumner – songwriting
Phil Tan – mixing
Shea Taylor – production, songwriting
Brian Thompson – songwriting
Mike Tocci – recording, supervising engineering
Marcos Tovar – supervising engineering
Andrew Vastola – recording
Cynthia Weil – songwriting
Wideboys – additional production, remixing
Andrew Wiliams – additional production, engineering, remixing
Leon Zervos – mastering

Charts

Weekly charts

Year-end charts

References

Rihanna albums
2009 remix albums
Def Jam Recordings remix albums
Electronic dance music remix albums